Naval Base Lingayen was a United States Navy base built during World War II at Lingayen Gulf on the northwestern Island of Luzon in the Philippines. The base was founded after the Invasion of Lingayen Gulf on January 9, 1945 at Lingayen city and the surrounding gulf. The Naval base was used to support the later operations at Manila and the rest of Luzon Island and then at Okinawa. Lingayen Gulf offered excellent fleet anchorage.

History 
US Navy Seabee pontoon battalion landed with the troops at Lingayen on January 9, 1945. The Seabee task was building pontoon piers out into Lingayen Gulf so the massive about of supplies needed for the invasion could be unloaded quickly. Over 90% of the invasion supplies were unloaded on the pontoon piers.
Seabee built a Naval Base Headquarters at the city of San Fernando on the north east side of Lingayen Gulf. A supply depot was built at Lingayen, US Navy Advance Base 6. The US Army had its Headquarters at San Fernando also, called Base M. The Army had a number of camps around Lingayen Gulf.

Bases and facilities
San Fernando, La Union Naval section base, Harbor HQ, Base HQ
Radar station
Naval hospital 
Fleet anchorage
Fleet Post office 3960 SF 
Boat pool (to get to ships and other Lingayen Gulf facilities)
Look out tower
Base camp

Lingayen Gulf:
Pier
Supply depot, Army and Navy
Seabee Camp
Seabee depot
Seabee sawmill 
Coral quarry
Camp, barracks and mess hall
Power plant
Ammunition depot
Aviation gasoline Tank farm
USS Quapaw (ATF-110) tug
USS Piedmont (AD-17) destroyer tender 
USS Agawam (AOG-6) Gas tanker
USS Severn (AO-61) Fleet oiler
USS Thuban (AKA-19) Stores Ship

PT Boat Sual Bay 
Motor torpedo boat tender USS Wachapreague (AGP-8) help keep the boat supplied and running.

Airfields
Lingayen Airfield at the Lingayen beach, (6th Army) now Lingayen Airport.
San Fernando Airfield near Naval Base Headquarters at San Fernando, now San Fernando Airport. 
Mangaldan Airfield US Marines, near Port of Lingayen, abandoned after war.
Rosales Airfield inland Airfield, now Rosales Airport.

Seaplane Base Lingayen
Seaplane base was built in Cabalitan Bay at Cabalitan Island at  
The seaplane were served by the seaplane tenders: USS Barataria (AVP-33) and USS Currituck (AV-7).
Later the Seaplane base was moved to Sual Bay. The US Navy's VPB-71, Patrol Bombing Squadron 71, operated Consolidated PBY Catalina type PBY-5A, called "Black Cat" out of the seaplane bases. On February 28, 1945, VP-28 arrived operating Martin PBM Mariners. The Black Cat and Martin PBM, did antisubmarine patrols and attacked Empire of Japan shipping in the South China Sea. The USS Tangier (AV-8) took over the seaplane tender duties on March 13. US Navy Seabees built seaplane ramps and bases both at Sual Bay and Cabalitan Island.

Seabee units

115th Construction Battalion
102nd Construction Battalion
1st Special Naval Construction Battalion, Sept. 1945 only
Naval Construction Maintenance Unit 606 
Seabee Pontoon battalion

Loses

The invasion of Lingayen Gulf was costly for the US Navy, from December 14, 1944, to January 13, 1945, 24 ships were sunk and 67 were damaged by kamikaze attack planes. In the attacks, 746 seamen were killed and 1,365 wounded. Most of the ships were with the United States Third Fleet and United States Seventh Fleet, Task Group 77.2. Many of the ships had come from Naval Base Ulithi staging.
A few ships were damaged in Lingayen Gulf by small maru-ni boats, that had depth charges. LST-925 and LST-1028 were damaged by a maru-ni boats (US calling them torpedo boats at the time) from Sual. The USS Philip (DD-498), USS Robinson (DD-562) and USS Leutze were able to stop maru-ni boats before they attacked, 45 maru-ni boats were lost in total.

Japan landed and took Lingayen on December 22, 1941. US and Filipino Troops at Lingayen, retreated to Bataan, most becoming prisoners of war and part of the Bataan Death March in	April 1942.

Post war
With two large Naval Bases on Luzon: Naval Base Manila and Naval Base Subic Bay, Naval Base Lingayen was closed after the war.   

Gallery

See also

US Naval Base Philippines
Wallace Air Station at  San Fernando, La Union
Battle of Luzon
US Naval Advance Bases
Naval Base Milne Bay
Naval Base Brisbane

External links
youtube  Seabees of World War II
youtube  Lingayen

References 

Military installations of the Philippines
Closed installations of the United States Navy
Naval Base Lingayen
1945 in the Philippines